The 2022–23 season is the 36th season in the history of FC Barcelona Femení. In addition to the domestic league, Barcelona is also playing in this season's editions of the Copa de la Reina, Supercopa de España Femenina and UEFA Women's Champions League. Barcelona are coming off a successful 2021–22 campaign in which they won the domestic treble after winning the league, cup and super cup of Spain, and ended the season as runners-up in the 2021–22 UEFA Women's Champions League after being defeated 1–3 by Olympique Lyonnais in the final.

On transfer deadline day, 7 September, Barcelona broke the world record for a transfer fee in women's football when they signed English midfielder Keira Walsh from Manchester City for €470,000 in a three-year deal.

In their first match of the UEFA Women's Champions League group stage, Barcelona surpassed their previous goal-scoring record of six goals in one game in the competition after winning 9–0 against Benfica. In their last match of the Champions League group stage, a 6–0 win against Rosengård, Barcelona surpassed the record for most goals scored by a women's team in the group stages, scoring 29 goals in total and beating the previous record of 25 goals, set by PSG during the previous season.

On 22 January 2023, the team won the 2022–23 Supercopa de España Femenina. Two days later, they were technically disqualified from the 2022–23 Copa de la Reina de Fútbol, but have said they will appeal this decision.

Kits
Supplier: Nike
Sponsor: Spotify (front) / UNHCR – UN Refugee Agency (back)

Season overview

June
On 1 June, Barcelona announced that defender Leila Ouahabi would be leaving the club after thirteen years and 199 appearances; with the club she had scored seven goals and won every trophy possible, including five leagues titles and one Champions League. Speaking to Barça TV, Ouahabi said: "After 13 years at the club, I think my time has come. It's the end of one era and the start of another. I'm so proud of everything that I've achieved and want to thank the fans for all their support. I am leaving safe in the knowledge that I achieved everything that I set out to do."

On 3 June, Barcelona announced the contract renewal of head coach Jonatan Giráldez until 30 June 2024. On 4 June, Barcelona renewed the contract of defender Laia Codina until 2024. On 6 June and 7 June, Barcelona announced the renewals of goalkeeper Gemma Font and Swiss player Ana-Maria Crnogorčević respectively, both renewed until 2024.

On 17 June, Barcelona announced the first signing of the season, defender Nuria Rábano, who signed until 2024. On 18 June, the signing of English defender Lucy Bronze was announced, also until 2024. On 19 June, Barcelona announced the signing of Brazilian striker Geyse Ferreira until 2024. She was joint league top scorer in the previous season alongside Asisat Oshoala, with twenty goals.

On 22 June, striker Jenni Hermoso announced on Instagram that she was leaving the club. In six and a half seasons as a blaugrana, Hermoso became the club's all-time leading goalscorer with 181 goals in 224 official appearances. Her record allowed her to be the league's top scorer with Barça in 2016, 2017, 2020 and 2021. Hermoso was also top scorer in the 2020–21 Champions League. In her Instagram post, Hermoso said: "Everything comes and sometimes ends. I am very proud of having given my all in the shirt."

On 30 June, Barcelona announced that Dutch winger Lieke Martens was also departing the club after her contract ended. Her 158 appearances in the Barça shirt are a record for a non-Spanish player.

The record holder for most appearances for the club, defender Melanie Serrano, announced her retirement after eighteen years and 517 appearances, also announcing that she will stay on at the club working in a non-playing capacity. Forward Candela Andújar also announced her retirement in an Instagram post.

July
On 5 July, Barcelona announced that the captain Alexia Putellas had suffered an anterior cruciate ligament injury on her left knee while training with the Spanish national team at the Euro 2022 tournament. On 11 July, it was announced that Alexia would undergo an operation the next day. Also on 11 July, Barcelona announced the signing of striker Salma Paralluelo, who signed until 2026. On 12 July, Alexia had her operation. It was a success, though Alexia will likely miss the majority of the season due to recovery; it was estimated that the earliest she can return to play will be April 2023.

On 22 July, Barcelona's Nigerian striker Asisat Oshoala won the African Women's Footballer of the Year award for a record 5th time.

On 26 July, the contract renewal of defender Emma Ramírez until 2024 was announced. Barcelona also announced the signing of 16-year-old midfielder Vicky López, who signed until 2027.

On 31 July, Barcelona defender Lucy Bronze won the Euro 2022 tournament with England and striker Geyse Ferreira won the Copa América with Brazil.

August
On 6 August, Barcelona opened the pre-season with a 10–0 demolition of AEM Lleida in a friendly, which included a hat-trick by Caroline Graham Hansen.

On 9 August, Barcelona reached an agreement with defender Andrea Pereira to terminate her contract after playing four seasons with the club.

The team then travelled to France to take part in the AMOS Women's French Cup. On 16 August the team faced Bayern Munich in the semi-final of the tournament, where they were narrowly beaten 1–2. Then on 19 August, Barcelona won 5–4 on penalties against Paris Saint-Germain in the third place play-off match to finish third in the summer friendly tournament.

On 18 August, Barcelona announced that they have reached an agreement with plant-based food company Heura Foods. They will be the new partner of the first Barça women's team for the next three seasons; until the 30th of June 2025.

On 23 August, Barcelona retained the Joan Gamper Trophy after beating Montpellier 6–0 at Estadi Johan Cruyff; midfielder Patri Guijarro was named MVP of the match.

On 25 August, captain Alexia Putellas won the UEFA Women's Player of the Year Award for the second year in a row.

On 27 August, Barcelona reached an agreement with midfielder Andrea Falcón to terminate her contract after playing 41 matches for the club.

On 27 August, Barcelona concluded the pre-season with a 2–4 win on penalties against Granadilla Tenerife to win the invitational Teide Trophy for the first time.

On 30 August, Barcelona announced that they reached an agreement with the packaging company GLS Group, which became the official logistic partner of the squad and will remain a global sponsor of the club for the next three seasons, until 30 June 2025.

September
On transfer deadline day, 7 September, Barcelona broke the world record for a transfer fee in women's football when they signed English midfielder Keira Walsh from Manchester City for €470,000 in a three-year deal, until 30 June 2025.

On 9 September, Barcelona reached an agreement with Arsenal for the transfer of Brazilian striker Gio Queiroz to the English club.

On 11 September, Barcelona were supposed to play the first league match of the season against Levante Las Planas. Both teams arrived in Sant Joan Despí at the allotted time and, after warming up, they lined up for the game as normal. As no match officials arrived, they waited for the required half hour before the game was officially called off; like others, the match was postponed after the referee and match officials did not show up to the venue as part of a strike asking for higher wages from the Royal Spanish Football Federation. On 15 September 2022, a deal was reached between the parties to end the strike, which paved the way for the league season to start. A new date for the postponed match was decided by the federation: Barcelona will play the postponed first round match on 3 November 2022.

On 17 September, Barcelona started off the new season with a 2–0 win against Granadilla Tenerife, with goals from Caroline Graham Hansen and the new signing Geyse Ferreira. By coming off the bench to play in this match, Vicky López became the youngest person to play for Barcelona femení's first team in the professional era, at 16 years, 1 month and 19 days.

On 25 September, Barcelona won 1–4 against Villarreal to claim the first position in the league table for the first time this season. Goals were scored by Mapi León, Asisat Oshoala, and Clàudia Pina, and an own goal was scored by Villarreal defender Lara Mata.

October
On 1 October, Barcelona crushed Madrid CFF 7–0 to claim their third victory in a row and to maintain the first position in the league table. Caroline Graham Hansen scored once while Mariona Caldentey, Geyse Ferreira and Ana-Maria Crnogorčević scored two goals each.

On 3 October, the draw for the 2022–23 UEFA Women's Champions League group stage was held in Nyon. Barcelona was drawn into Group D and will play against Bayern Munich, Benfica, and Rosengård.

On 4 October, Barcelona announced that the home matches against Bayern Munich and Rosengård will be played at Camp Nou, while the home match against Benfica will be played at Estadi Johan Cruyff.

On 15 October, following the international break, Barcelona continued their dominance, taking their fourth straight win in the league by beating Athletic Club 0–3 with goals from Clàudia Pina, Geyse Ferreira and Mariona Caldentey.

On 17 October, captain Alexia Putellas won her second consecutive Ballon d'Or Féminin at the 2022 ceremony, and became the first-ever two-time winner of the honour, and the first to have won it in consecutive years. Aitana Bonmatí, Asisat Oshoala and Fridolina Rolfö and were also shortlisted for the award and were ranked 5th, 16th and 19th respectively.

On 19 October, in their first match of the UEFA Women's Champions League group stage, Barcelona surpassed their previous goal-scoring record of six goals in one game in the competition after winning 9–0 against Benfica; the new goal-scoring record for the team was achieved with goals from Patricia Guijarro, Aitana Bonmatí, Mariona Caldentey, Ana-Maria Crnogorčević, Clàudia Pina, who scored one goal each and Asisat Oshoala and Geyse Ferreira, who scored two goals each. The first goal of Asisat Oshoala scored in the 34th minute was chosen as the Goal of the Week for matchday 1 of the Champions League group stage. On the same day, Barcelona reached an agreement with the Mexican multinational food company Grupo Bimbo to become the club's Global Partner and the main partner for the women's football first team. The core strategies for this alliance involve promoting healthy and active lifestyles, fostering new talents, and a clear investment in women's empowerment. The women's team aim to become financially independent from the men's team with partnerships like the one with Bimbo.

On 20 October, Barcelona announced that defender Laia Codina had suffered an acromioclavicular joint dislocation – a separated shoulder – in her right shoulder, which occurred while playing in the match against Benfica the day before. It was announced that she would miss six weeks as a result of the injury and would return to play in early December.

On 21 October, captain Alexia Putellas won the Golden Player Woman award presented by the Italian sport magazine Tuttosport. She became the second winner of the award; Lieke Martens won it in 2021 while playing for Barcelona.

On 22 October, Barcelona won their sixth consecutive match of the season after defeating Real Betis with a 0–3 result. Goals were scored by Fridolina Rolfö and Caroline Graham Hansen, and an own goal was scored by Real Betis' forward Rinsola Babajide.

On 24 October, the second Gala de Fútbol Femenino was held by Mundo Deportivo, with several members of the team winning awards, and the team itself receiving special recognition for achieving a new record attendance for a women's football match in the previous season.

On 27 October, Barcelona won their second consecutive group stage match of the season against Rosengård and claimed their seventh win in a row in all competitions with a 1–4 result. Aitana Bonmatí and Mariona Caldentey both contributed to the win with two goals each. The first goal of Mariona Caldentey scored in the 65th minute where she scored from the halfway line was chosen as the Goal of the Week for matchday 2 of the Champions League group stage. During the match Norwegian striker Caroline Graham Hansen suffered an injury, the tests carried out the next day revealed that she had suffered an injury to the biceps femoris tendon in her right thigh, otherwise known as a pulled hamstring.

On 30 October, Barcelona narrowly beat Levante 2–1 to get their sixth straight win in the league. Aitana Bonmatí and Ingrid Engen both scored to get the hard fought win for the team. This win also marked the 41st consecutive league win for the team and the 56th win out of 56 matches played in all competitions at the Johan Cruyff stadium since its inauguration in 2019. In that time, the team has scored 293 goals and conceded just 22 goals. In addition, against Levante, Barça won their 50th consecutive match at home in the league. The last match they did not win outright was on 13 February 2019; since then, the team has scored 271 goals and conceded just 21 goals.

On the same day, recently-promoted Barcelona B player Vicky López was awarded the Golden Ball, the award for the best player of the tournament, at the 2022 FIFA U-17 Women's World Cup after Spain defeated Colombia 0–1 in the final to win their second title. She inspired Spain to a comeback against Japan in the quarter-finals after scoring two goals in six minutes at the end (87', 90+3') to win the match 1–2. She became the second Barcelona player to win the award after Clàudia Pina did the same at the 2018 FIFA U-17 Women's World Cup.

By the end of the month, the team's continued success without their injured players, especially Putellas, was praised, as was the incorporation of summer signings, particularly Bronze, Walsh, and Geyse.

November
On 3 November, Barcelona won their ninth consecutive match of the season after beating Levante Las Planas 0–4 with goals from Patricia Guijarro, Asisat Oshoala, Irene Paredes and Salma Paralluelo who scored her first goal for the club.

On 6 November, Barcelona defeated Real Madrid 0–4 and got their ninth competitive El Clásico win out of nine matches played between the teams. Goals were scored by Ana-Maria Crnogorčević, Patricia Guijarro, Aitana Bonmatí and Fridolina Rolfö. Barcelona has won all of their matches against Real Madrid, scoring 33 goals and conceding only 5 goals.

On 7 November, the second edition of the Golsmedia FutbolFest Awards Gala was held by the Royal Spanish Football Federation at their headquarters, La Ciudad del Fútbol in Madrid; Alexia Putellas won the award for the Best Player of the Liga Iberdrola for her performances throughout the 2021–22 season, Sandra Paños won the award for the Best Goalkeeper of the Liga Iberdrola for the 2021–22 season, and the team itself received the SuperCampeonas Award, as a special recognition for their unbeaten and perfect domestic season.

On 17 November, captain Alexia Putellas won the Globe Soccer Award for Best Women's Player of the Year 2022 for her performances throughout the year. This was her record second win of the award after she won the award for the first time last year. Aitana Bonmatí, Caroline Graham Hansen, and Lucy Bronze (the only female winner besides Putellas) were also nominated.

On 20 November, Barcelona took a powerful win, defeating Deportivo Alavés 8–0. Clàudia Pina scored twice, with Asisat Oshoala, Fridolina Rolfö, Mapi León, Salma Paralluelo, Ana-Maria Crnogorčević and Geyse Ferreira each contributing to the victory. It was also León's 200th official match with the club, and the first appearance for Bruna Vilamala after over a year of recuperation for an injury she suffered on 25 October 2021; León scored and Vilamala provided the assist for the last goal.

On 21 November, the 10th edition of the Gala de les Estrelles del Futbol Català (Catalan Football Stars Gala) was held by the Catalan Football Federation at the Old Factory Estrella Damm (Antigua fábrica Damm), in Barcelona, for football and futsal in Catalonia. Alexia Putellas was crowned as the Best Women's Catalan Player of the Year for a record fourth time; she received 51.2% of the jury votes and beat her teammate Aitana Bonmatí (46.3%) to the prize. Putellas was also given the award for the Top scorer of the Year for the 18 goals she scored in the domestic league last season. The Most Promising Player award was given to Clàudia Pina with 80.5% of the votes, ahead of her teammates Meritxell Font (12.2%) and Júlia Bartel (7.3%).

On 24 November, Barcelona defeated Bayern Munich 3–0 in their first match of the season to be held at the Camp Nou, and their third Women's Champions League match of the season. They maintained their perfect streak, with the goals coming from Geyse Ferreira, Aitana Bonmatí and Clàudia Pina. Pina's goal, scored in the 66th minute from outside the box, was chosen as the Goal of the Week for matchday 3 of the Champions League group stage, it was also later chosen as the Goal of the Group Stage.

Barcelona also set the record for the highest ever attendance for a Women's Champions League group stage game, and the fourth-highest of all Women's Champions League matches (the top two were also set at Camp Nou), with a record crowd of 46,967 spectators, even as the south stand was closed for renovation and a 2022 FIFA World Cup match was being played at the same time. Barcelona would not play league games in the Camp Nou over the men's World Cup break, a choice that received some criticism, as the venue is popular and the increased attendance possibilities could help grow the women's game in Spain and further raise the profile of the team.

On 27 November, Barcelona beat Atlético Madrid 1–6, with Salma Paralluelo scoring two goals off the bench and Ana-Maria Crnogorčević, Mapi León, Lucy Bronze, and Ingrid Engen also netting goals; Bronze's goal was her first for the team.

Towards the end of November, members of the team and their male counterparts starred in videos promoting the 2022 Spotify Wrapped, as part of the club's affiliation with Spotify.

December
On 3 December, the team extended their winning streak to eleven league wins in a row by beating Real Sociedad 2–1 in a difficult match. Coming from behind, Marta Torrejón scored in the 62nd minute to equalise, and Lucy Bronze scored in the 89th minute to complete the dramatic comeback and maintain their 100% win record since the start of the season.

However, on 7 December, the team suffered their first defeat of the season and their first competitive defeat since 21 May 2022 (the 1–3 loss against Olympique Lyonnais that saw them come second in the 2022 UEFA Women's Champions League final). Playing Bayern Munich at the Allianz Arena, Barcelona again lost 1–3, with their goal coming from Geyse Ferreira. This defeat ended the fourteen-match undefeated and winning streak across all competitions that the team had enjoyed since the start of the season. Despite the defeat and being equal with Bayern Munich on points, Barcelona remained first in Group D, because they had better head-to-head goal difference against Bayern and better goal difference overall.

On 10 December, Barcelona bounced back from the setback with a 4–0 win against Alhama, with Clàudia Pina, Salma Paralluelo, Bruna Vilamala and Asisat Oshoala getting on the scoresheet.

In the 2022 edition of the International Federation of Football History & Statistics Women's Awards, Alexia Putellas won the Player of the Year award for a record second time. She also won the Playmaker of the Year award for the second time, with teammates Keira Walsh and Aitana Bonmatí placing third and fourth respectively.

On 15 December, Barcelona saw themselves through to the quarter-finals of the Champions League, with a 6–2 away win against Benfica. Goals were scored by Irene Paredes, Clàudia Pina, Aitana Bonmatí, Ana-Maria Crnogorčević, and Mariona Caldentey, and an own goal was scored by Benfica defender Ana Seiça. Pina's goal, scored in the second additional minute before half-time (45+2') from just outside the edge of the box, was chosen as the Goal of the Week for matchday 5 of the Champions League group stage. Barcelona goalkeeper Sandra Paños saved two penalty kicks during the match, both near the close of the game and each by correctly diving in a different direction.

The Marca Women's Sports Awards Gala was held on 19 December 2022, at the Old Factory Estrella Damm (Antigua fábrica Damm), in Barcelona, recognizing the best football players and athletes of the previous season. Alexia Putellas was awarded the MVP award, Asisat Oshoala and Geyse Ferreira shared the Pichichi Trophy, having both scored 20 goals last season, Salma Paralluelo won the best Goal of the Year award, and manager Jonatan Giráldez won the Best Coach award.

The GOAL50 list of the best women's players of the year was published on 20 December, with Alexia Putellas coming first for the second consecutive year. Overall, ten Barcelona players placed on the list in the following order: 1. Alexia Putellas, 2. Aitana Bonmatí, 5. Fridolina Rolfö, 6. Caroline Graham Hansen, 7. Lucy Bronze, 9. Asisat Oshoala, 11. Keira Walsh, 15. Mapi León, 18. Irene Paredes, 27. Mariona Caldentey.

Having already made it out of the Champions League group stage, Barcelona faced Rosengård, who were already eliminated, at home at the Camp Nou on 21 December, for their last match of the year. Realistically only needing to win to top the group, Barcelona went up in the first ten minutes and continued to dominate, winning 6–0, including a brace from Asisat Oshoala and a free kick from the edge of the box from Mapi León, the rest of the goals came from Fridolina Rolfö, Marta Torrejón and Irene Paredes. Rolfö's goal, scored in the 47th minute, was chosen as the Goal of the Week for matchday 6 of the Champions League group stage. In this match, Barcelona broke the record for the most goals scored by a women's team in the group stages of the Champions League, scoring 29 goals and beating last years record of 25 goals set by PSG. The match was attended by 28,720 fans, making it the second highest attended match of the season, and brought the total attendance of all the matches played at Camp Nou throughout the year to 258,888 spectators. The win was also Barcelona's 50th overall win in the Champions League.

The list of The 100 Best Female Footballers in the World was fully released on 24 December, with twelve Barcelona players on the list, including five in the Top 10: 1. Alexia Putellas, 4. Aitana Bonmatí, 8. Caroline Graham Hansen, 9. Keira Walsh, 10. Lucy Bronze; 17. Mapi León, 19. Fridolina Rolfö, 30. Irene Paredes, 31. Patricia Guijarro, 38. Asisat Oshoala, 58. Mariona Caldentey, 72. Geyse Ferreira.

On 30 December, Alexia Putellas was named the Best Female Athlete of 2022 by the International Sports Press Association (AIPS), receiving 452 votes (11.96%) from the panel of 420 journalists from 113 countries who had voted. On the same day, Clàudia Pina's UWCL goal scored against Bayern Munich on matchday 3 was voted the Goal of the Group Stage by fans. Also on 30 December, the Commonwealth Honours Committee released its 2023 New Year Honours, in which Lucy Bronze (Lucia Roberta Tough Bronze) was made a Member of The Most Excellent Order of the British Empire for services to football.

January
On 7 January 2023, Barcelona got their first win of the new year, and their thirteenth consecutive win in the league, by defeating Sevilla at home 4–0. The goals were scored by Asisat Oshoala, Clàudia Pina and Salma Paralluelo, who took a brace after coming on as a substitute.

With the team having a packed schedule in January, there were ten changes to the starting line-up for the next match, a Copa de la Reina tie against second division team Osasuna on 10 January, only Keira Walsh being retained and several of the B team called up. Barcelona won 9–0 away, with Bruna Vilamala scoring the first hat-trick of the season, Aitana Bonmatí and Salma Paralluelo each netting two goals, and Geyse Ferreira and Mariona Caldentey also adding to the tally. During the match, a coach mentioned on social media that Geyse had been sent off in the Copa de la Reina at the end of the previous season, while playing for Madrid CFF, and had no prior opportunity to serve the match suspension; Osasuna announced later in the day that they would appeal the match result.

On 12 January, the shortlists for The Best FIFA Football Awards were announced: Aitana Bonmatí, Alexia Putellas, and Keira Walsh were nominated for The Best FIFA Women's Player (which Putellas won the previous year); Sandra Paños was nominated for The Best FIFA Goalkeeper; and Salma Paralluelo was nominated for the FIFA Puskás Award, though for a goal she scored against Barcelona while playing for Villarreal. Jonatan Giráldez was considered a notable omission from the coach shortlist.

On 14 January, Barcelona got a comfortable 3–0 win away against Sporting de Huelva, making it the season's fourteenth consecutive league win in as many matches. Asisat Oshoala scored twice and Mariona Caldentey scored once.

The middle of January saw contract extensions for the club's Norwegian players: forward Caroline Graham Hansen signed until 30 June 2026 on 16 January, with midfielder Ingrid Engen signing until 30 June 2025 the next day.

On 19 January, Deloitte published their Deloitte Football Money League, including women's teams for the first time. Barcelona femení ranked as number one in women's football, having generated €7.7million in the previous season, largely from marketing and advertising. Deloitte also noted the growing importance of transfer fees in the revenue of women's teams.

Barcelona started their Supercopa defense against Real Madrid on 19 January 2023, in the second El Clásico of the season, which they won 3–1 after extra-time, advancing to the final thanks to goals from Clàudia Pina, Mariona Caldentey and Salma Paralluelo. In the final on 22 January 2023, they faced Real Sociedad. Barcelona won 3–0, with two goals from Aitana Bonmatí and another in added time from Asisat Oshoala. With the victory, Barcelona became the only club to win the Supercopa three times; the match also saw them achieve their 100th goal of the season across all competitions.

During the winners' ceremony after the match, spectators noted that both teams were made to collect their medals from tables on the pitch; nobody from the RFEF presented Barcelona with their champions' cup; and it took some time before an official gave Aitana her MVP trophy. A video of the players collecting their own medals quickly went viral in Spain, and some media reported that the RFEF officials did not want to give the teams a reception as they both have multiple players in "the 15" who are in dispute with the RFEF over the conditions of the Spanish women's national team. The RFEF responded that it was protocol to have players collect their own medals in both the men's and women's Supercopas; journalists and social media pointed out that when the men's final had been played earlier in the month in Riyadh, RFEF president Luis Rubiales awarded medals to each player on a stage. The RFEF said that the pitch selected for the women's final was too "old and small" to make it easy for officials to go to the pitch, or for all players to fit in the box. The medal protocol had not been explained to the teams before the match, with the RFEF noting that they had not asked. While Barcelona coach Jonatan Giráldez said he had not noticed his players be disappointed; that he did not find anything unusual with the lack of ceremony because the women's team has always had such treatment; and he accepted the protocol explanation, he still felt that the RFEF should have found a way to give them a proper medal ceremony. The Association of Spanish Footballers (AFE) criticised the RFEF, saying that the teams were undervalued during their celebration and were victims of discrimination, accusing the RFEF of not promoting women's football, a heated issue in Spain at the time.

After receiving the Copa de la Reina match complaint from Osasuna, the RFEF handed out its first judgment on 24 January. Despite Barcelona's dominant win, and while accepting that they did not list Geyse's suspension on their website, the RFEF disqualified Barcelona's result in the match (as a knock-out match, the technical loss would see them expelled from the tournament) and fined them €1,001 (in application of article 79, sections 1 and 2. b), of the Disciplinary Code of the RFEF). The RFEF handed the same judgment to Sevilla, who also fielded a suspended player in their Copa de la Reina match on the same day, which also was not listed by the RFEF. While another system did show the suspensions in the match results from the previous season, the match results can only be viewed by the clubs involved, and Geyse had moved club. The teams were given 10 days to appeal the verdict; Barcelona said that they will and, "should the sanction not be revoked on appeal, FC Barcelona will take every possible action, as it is considered that the line-up ended up being deemed ineligible due to technicalities in this case."

On 25 January, Barcelona won their 50th consecutive league match in defeating Levante Las Planas 7–0; Asisat Oshoala scored the season's second hat-trick, with Ana-Maria Crnogorčević taking a brace, and a goal each being scored by Mariona Caldentey and Vicky López. In doing so, Vicky became Barcelona's youngest ever first-team goal-scorer, at just 16 years, 5 months and 27 days (16 years, 183 days). FIFA had reported at the start of 2023 that the team could become the first football team (men's or women's) in history to achieve 50 consecutive league victories, having surpassed Lyon's 46-win record at the end of 2022; though Barcelona achieved the FIFA-certified record, the Arsenal women reached a record 51 consecutive league victories in the pre-professional era. Arsenal also achieved a 108-unbeaten run, (the FIFA record for this is held by the Steaua București men's team, with 104). Hat-trick scorer Oshoala has previously played for Arsenal.

On 26 January, the team's Swedish forward Fridolina Rolfö extended her contract until 30 June 2026. On the same day, the International Federation of Football History & Statistics released its ranking of the Women's World Best Club for 2022, updating its criteria to use performance data from both domestic and international competitions, as they used for the men's club ranking, rather than a vote. Barcelona femení was ranked first as the best women's club in the world, with 738 points, nearly 200 points clear of second place. The next day, defender Irene Paredes extended her contract until 30 June 2025.

On 29 January, Barcelona beat Granadilla Tenerife 6–0 away. Clàudia Pina, Aitana Bonmatí and Lucy Bronze all contributed to the win with one goal each, while Asisat Oshoala got her second hat-trick of the season just four days after her first, achieving two hat-tricks in two consecutive matches. The first five goals were scored in the first half, with Bronze's coming at 90+2' just before the match ended. It was the 100th Barcelona match for Ana-Maria Crnogorčević.

On 31 January, at the end of the winter transfer window, Barcelona signed Italian midfielder Giulia Dragoni, to join the B side. She became the first non-Spanish female player to join La Masia.

February 
On 1 February, Barcelona achieved their 52nd consecutive league win by defeating Valencia 4–0 away, overtaking Arsenal's 51, to hold the absolute longest league winning streak in football.

On 5 February, Barcelona defeated Real Betis 7–0. One goal each was scored by Geyse Ferreira, Clàudia Pina, Mariona Caldentey and Keira Walsh, in her first goal for the club, with another hat-trick for Asisat Oshoala, her third hat-trick in 11 days. Fridolina Rolfö took a hat-trick of assists, providing for Pina and Oshoala's first and second.

The draw for the Champions League knockout stages was held on 10 February at UEFA headquarters in Nyon, with the full bracket to the final announced. As Barcelona finished top of their group, they were one of four seeded teams. Barcelona were drawn against debutants Roma in the quarter-final; it was soon announced that the first leg of the tie, with Roma at home, will be played at Stadio Olimpico on 21 March, with the second leg to be played at Camp Nou on 29 March. The winner on aggregate will advance to the semi-finals, where they will face the winner of the tie between Chelsea and Lyon.

On 11 February, Barcelona defeated Deportivo Alavés 4–0 away, in what was their last match of February ahead of the international break. Goals were scored by Asisat Oshoala, Aitana Bonmatí and Clàudia Pina, and an own goal was scored by Deportivo Alavés' defender Osinachi Ohale.

The FIFA FIFPRO Women's World Squad was announced on 13 February, with eight Barcelona players making the 23-player list: Sandra Paños was one of three goalkeepers; Lucy Bronze, Mapi León and Irene Paredes were among the seven defenders; and Aitana Bonmatí, Caroline Graham Hansen, Alexia Putellas, and Keira Walsh made up over half of the midfield. From the World Squad, a World XI is set to be announced at the end of the month, along with the winner of The Best FIFA Women's Player.

On 20 February, Aitana Bonmatí received the Barça Players Award for the second consecutive time, awarded by the FC Barcelona Players Association in recognition of her fair play during the previous season. This same day the nominations for the Laureus World Sports Awards were announced: Alexia Putellas was nominated for Sportswoman of the Year. On 21 February, goalkeeper Cata Coll extended her contract until 30 June 2026, with forward Clàudia Pina extending her contract to the same date on 22 February.

Also on 22 February, defender Bronze and midfielder Walsh won the 2023 Arnold Clark Cup, retaining it for England.

On 27 February, the ceremony for The Best FIFA Football Awards 2022 was held in Paris. Out of the eight Barcelona players shortlisted for the FIFA FIFPRO Women's World 11, four of them were included in the 2022 FIFPRO World 11: Lucy Bronze (in her fifth appearance), Mapi León, Keira Walsh and Alexia Putellas. With four players, Barcelona was the joint-most represented team on the list (along with the England women's national team). Putellas also won the 2022 award for The Best FIFA Women's Player, taking the title for the second consecutive year. Barcelona extended their lead as the club with the most The Best Women's Player awards, with three, following Putellas' win the year before and Lieke Martens' win in 2017. No other club has won it more than once.

March
On 5 March, following the international break, Barcelona defeated Villarreal 5–0 to achieve their 50th consecutive league win under Jonatan Giráldez (out of 50). Asisat Oshoala and Salma Paralluelo scored one goal each. Norwegian forward Caroline Graham Hansen came on in the 65th minute after four months out with injury, scoring a hat-trick. Jana Fernández also made her first appearance after over a year of recovery following an injury she suffered on 14 February 2022. Aitana Bonmatí recorded a hat-trick of assists, providing for Paralluelo and Graham Hansen's first and second goals.

Spain's court of arbitration for sport dismissed Barcelona's appeal to be reinstated in the Copa de la Reina on 10 March. Without reviewing the case, it upheld the sanction, which had also been upheld by the appeals committee. Though the last avenue of sporting appeal, Barcelona would still be able to challenge the decision in a legal court, which Catalan state broadcaster CCMA suggested they may choose to do for precedent.

On 11 March, Barcelona beat Levante 4–0 away, with Aitana Bonmatí scoring two goals, while Clàudia Pina and Fridolina Rolfö scored one goal each.

On 17 March, the team continued their winning streak with a 5–1 comeback victory against Valencia. Both Fridolina Rolfö and Salma Paralluelo scored braces and Marta Torrejón scored one goal. Aitana Bonmatí continued her amazing form and recorded her second hat-trick of assists in the last three matches. Cata Coll also made her first appearance after over a year of recovery following an injury she suffered on 22 February 2022. The team came close to breaking their own league record of minutes played without conceding a goal, which was achieved during the 2020–21 season and stood at 962 minutes, however the team fell six minutes short of breaking the record after they conceded a goal at the 12th minute of the match, reaching 957 minutes without conceding a goal.

Players

Current squad

FC Barcelona Femení B 
Players from FC Barcelona Femení B and FC Barcelona Femení C who have a squad number and are eligible to play for the first team.

Contract renewals

Transfers

In

Out

Competitions

Overall record

Pre-season and friendlies
Barcelona opened the pre-season with a 10–0 demolition of AEM Lleida in a friendly, which included a hat-trick by Graham Hansen. They then travelled to France to take part in the AMOS Women's French Cup. They faced Bayern Munich in the semi-final of the tournament, where they were narrowly beaten 1–2. Barcelona then won 5–4 on penalties against Paris Saint-Germain in the third place play-off match to finish third in the summer friendly tournament. They retained the Joan Gamper Trophy after beating Montpellier 6–0. Barcelona concluded the pre-season with a 2–4 win on penalties against Granadilla Tenerife to win the invitational Teide Trophy for the first time.

Liga F

League table

Results summary

Results by round

Matches

Copa de la Reina

Due to their placement in the previous season, Barcelona entered in the Round of 16. In the draw on 15 November 2022, their opponents were selected as Osasuna, who they defeated 0–9. Despite the dominant win, on 24 January 2023, the Royal Spanish Football Federation disqualified the team from the match for fielding an ineligible player (Geyse Ferreira), as she was suspended (after being sent off in her last Copa de la Reina match, which she played in for a different team during the previous season) but did play in the match. The RFEF accepted that they made a mistake in listing suspensions by not including Geyse, but also said that Barcelona should have had more diligence than them in checking. As the match was in the knock-out stages, being handed a disqualification (technical loss) also expels Barcelona from the tournament.

Supercopa de España Femenina

The draw for the semi-finals was held on 21 December 2022 in Mérida. Barcelona started their Supercopa defense against Real Madrid on 19 January 2023, in the second El Clásico of the season, where they won 3–1 after extra-time and advanced to the final. In the final they defeated Real Sociedad 3–0, winning the Supercopa for a record third time.

UEFA Women's Champions League

Group stage

Knockout phase

Quarter-finals

Statistics

Overall

Goalscorers

Hat-tricks

(H) – Home; (A) – Away

Assists

Hat-trick of assists

(H) – Home; (A) – Away

Cleansheets

Disciplinary record 

{| class="wikitable" style="text-align:center;width:80%;"
|-
! rowspan=2 style="background:#26559B; color:#FFF000; " width=15| 
! rowspan=2 style="background:#26559B; color:#FFF000; " width=15| 
! rowspan=2 style="background:#26559B; color:#FFF000; " width=15| 
! rowspan=2 style="background:#26559B; color:#FFF000; " width=175| Player
! colspan=3 style="background:#26559B; color:#FFF000; " width=120| 
! colspan=3 style="background:#26559B; color:#FFF000; " width=120| 
! colspan=3 style="background:#26559B; color:#FFF000; " width=150| 
! colspan=3 style="background:#26559B; color:#FFF000; " width=140| 
! colspan=3 style="background:#26559B; color:#FFF000; " width=120| Total
|-
! style="background:#26559B; color:#FFF000; " width=35 | 
! style="background:#26559B; color:#FFF000; " width=35 | 
! style="background:#26559B; color:#FFF000; " width=35 | 
! style="background:#26559B; color:#FFF000; " width=35 | 
! style="background:#26559B; color:#FFF000; " width=35 | 
! style="background:#26559B; color:#FFF000; " width=35 | 
! style="background:#26559B; color:#FFF000; " width=35 | 
! style="background:#26559B; color:#FFF000; " width=35 | 
! style="background:#26559B; color:#FFF000; " width=35 | 
! style="background:#26559B; color:#FFF000; " width=35 | 
! style="background:#26559B; color:#FFF000; " width=35 | 
! style="background:#26559B; color:#FFF000; " width=35 | 
! style="background:#26559B; color:#FFF000; " width=35 | 
! style="background:#26559B; color:#FFF000; " width=35 | 
! style="background:#26559B; color:#FFF000; " width=35 | 
|-
| 2
| DF
| 
|align=left| Irene Paredes
||2|| || || || || ||2||1|| || || || ||4||1||
|-
| 4
| DF
| 
|align=left| María Pilar León
||3|| || || || || || || || ||1|| || ||4|| ||
|-
| 18
| FW
| 
|align=left| Geyse Ferreira
||2|| || || || || || || || ||1|| || ||3|| ||
|-
| 10
| FW
| 
|align=left| Caroline Graham Hansen
||2|| || || || || || || || || || || ||2|| ||
|-
| 16
| FW
| 
|align=left| Fridolina Rolfö
||2|| || || || || || || || || || || ||2|| ||
|-
| 1
| GK
| 
|align=left| Sandra Paños
||2|| || || || || || || || || || || ||2|| ||
|-
| 3
| DF
| 
|align=left| Laia Codina
||2|| || || || || || || || || || || ||2|| ||
|-
| 22
| DF
| 
|align=left| Nuria Rábano
||1|| || || || || || || || ||1|| || ||2|| ||
|-
| 14
| MF
| 
|align=left| Aitana Bonmatí
||1|| || || || || || || || ||1|| || ||2|| ||
|-
| 7
| DF
| 
|align=left| Ana-Maria Crnogorčević
||1|| || || || || || || || || || || ||1|| ||
|-
| 9
| FW
| 
|align=left| Mariona Caldentey
||1|| || || || || || || || || || || ||1|| ||
|-
| 20
| FW
| 
|align=left| Asisat Oshoala
||1|| || || || || || || || || || || ||1|| ||
|-
| 15
| DF
| 
|align=left| Lucy Bronze
|| || || || || || ||1|| || || || || ||1|| ||
|-
| 17
| FW
| 
|align=left| Salma Paralluelo
|| || || || || || ||1|| || || || || ||1|| ||
|-
! style="background:#26559B; color:#FFF000; "; colspan=4|  Totals
!20|| || || || || ||4||1|| ||4|| || ||28||1||

Injury record 

{| class="wikitable" style="text-align:center"
|-
! style="background:#26559B; color:#FFF000; " width=30|
! style="background:#26559B; color:#FFF000; " width=30|
! style="background:#26559B; color:#FFF000; " width=30|
! style="background:#26559B; color:#FFF000; " width=160|Name
! style="background:#26559B; color:#FFF000; " width=300|
! style="background:#26559B; color:#FFF000; " width=70|
! style="background:#26559B; color:#FFF000; " width=125|
! style="background:#26559B; color:#FFF000; " width=145|
! style="background:#26559B; color:#FFF000; " width=130|
! style="background:#26559B; color:#FFF000; " width=150|
|-
| 19
| FW
| 
| align=left|Bruna Vilamala
| Anterior cruciate ligament injury – right knee
| 
| Barça Buzz
| vs Portugal with Spain
| 25 October 2021
| 18 November 2022
|-
| 5
| DF
| 
| align=left|Jana Fernández
| Anterior cruciate ligament injury – right knee
| 
| FCB.com
| in training
| 14 February 2022
| 28 February 2023
|-
| 13
| GK
| 
| align=left|Cata Coll
| Anterior cruciate ligament injury – left knee
| 
| Sport
| in training
| 22 February 2022
| 3 March 2023
|-
| 11
| MF
| 
| align=left|Alexia Putellas
| Anterior cruciate ligament injury – left knee
| 
| FCB.com
| in training
| 5 July 2022
| April – July 2023
|-
| 20
| FW
| 
| align=left|Asisat Oshoala
| Medial collateral ligament injury
| 
| BBC
| 
| 6 July 2022
| rowspan=2|8 September 2022
|-
| 22
| DF
| 
| align=left|Nuria Rábano
| Ankle sprain
| 
| Diario AS
| in training
| 3 August 2022
|-
| 14
| MF
| 
| align=left|Aitana Bonmatí
| Calf strain – right calf
| 
| FCB.com
| in training
| 10 August 2022
| 15 September 2022
|-
| 3
| DF
| 
| align=left|Laia Codina
| Thigh strain – right thigh
| 
| Sport
| in training
| 15 August 2022
| 8 September 2022
|-
| 10
| FW
| 
| align=left|Caroline Graham Hansen
| Minor knee injury
| 
| FCB Twitter
| rowspan=2| vs Montpellier
| rowspan=2| 23 August 2022
| 25 August 2022
|-
| 23
| MF
| 
| align=left|Ingrid Engen
| Concussion
| 
| FCB Twitter
| 28 August 2022
|-
| 8
| DF
| 
| align=left|Marta Torrejón
| Thigh strain – right thigh
| 
| FCB Twitter
| in training
| 25 August 2022
| rowspan=2|9 September 2022
|-
| 4
| DF
| 
| align=left|María Pilar León
| Cervical strain
| 
| SEFF Twitter
| in training
| 28 August 2022
|-
| 17
| FW
| 
| align=left|Salma Paralluelo
| Thigh strain – right thigh
| 
| rowspan=2| FCB TwitterFCB Twitter
| in training
| rowspan=2| 16 September 2022
| rowspan=2| 24 September 2022
|-
| 6
| FW
| 
| align=left|Clàudia Pina
| Lumbar strain
| 
| in training
|-
| 14
| MF
| 
| align=left|Aitana Bonmatí
| Thigh strain – right thigh
| 
| FCB.com
| in training
| 20 September 2022
| 15 October 2022
|-
| 25
| DF
| 
| align=left|Emma Ramírez
| Thigh strain – right thigh
| 
| FCB Twitter
| in training
| 24 September 2022
| 23 November 2022
|-
| 1
| GK
| 
| align=left|Sandra Paños
| Ankle sprain – left ankle
| 
| rowspan=2| FCB Twitter
| in training
| rowspan=2| 30 September 2022
| 21 October 2022
|-
| 17
| FW
| 
| align=left|Salma Paralluelo
| Thigh strain – right thigh
| 
| in training
| 25 October 2022
|-
| 3
| DF
| 
| align=left|Laia Codina
| Separated shoulder – right shoulder
| 
| FCB.com
| vs Benfica
| 19 October 2022
| 19 November 2022
|-
| 10
| FW
| 
| align=left|Caroline Graham Hansen
| Pulled hamstring – right thigh
| 
| FCB.com
| vs Rosengård
| 27 October 2022
| 2 March 2023
|-
| 9
| FW
| 
| align=left|Mariona Caldentey
| Pulled hamstring – right thigh
| 
| FCB Twitter
| in training
| 2 November 2022
| 26 November 2022
|-
| 15
| DF
| 
| align=left|Lucy Bronze
| Knee injury
| 
| Mundo Deportivo
| with England
| 11 November 2022
| rowspan=2|23 November 2022
|-
| 14
| MF
| 
| align=left|Aitana Bonmatí
| Muscle injury
| 
| FCB Twitter
| in training
| 19 November 2022
|-
| 25
| DF
| 
| align=left|Emma Ramírez
| Leg injury – right leg
| 
| FCB Twitter
| in training
| 20 December 2022
| 4 January 2023
|-
| 23
| MF
| 
| align=left|Ingrid Engen
| Rectus femoris muscle injury – right leg
| 
| FCB Twitter
| vs Sevilla
| 7 January 2023
| 1 March 2023
|-
| 19
| FW
| 
| align=left|Bruna Vilamala
| Quadriceps injury – left leg
| 
| FCB Twitter
| in training
| 13 January 2023
| 4 February 2023
|-
| 21
| MF
| 
| align=left|Keira Walsh
| Thigh injury – left thigh
| 
| Soccerway
| vs Real Madrid
| 19 January 2023
| 29 January 2023
|-
| 17
| FW
| 
| align=left|Salma Paralluelo
| Thigh strain – left thigh
| 
| FCB Twitter
| in training
| 25 January 2023
| 4 February 2023
|-
| rowspan=2 |9
| rowspan=2 |FW
| rowspan=2 |
| rowspan=2; align=left|Mariona Caldentey
| Thigh strain – left thigh
| rowspan=2 |
| FCB Twitter
| in training
| 10 February 2023
| rowspan=2 |
|-
| Biceps femoris injury – left thigh
| FCB Twitter
| in training
| 24 February 2023
|-
| 6
| FW
| 
| align=left|Clàudia Pina
| Ankle sprain – right ankle
| 
| FCB Twitter
| in training
| 16 March 2023
| 
|-

Awards

Notes

References

FC Barcelona Femení seasons
2022–23 in Spanish women's football
Barcelona Femenino
2023 in Catalonia